Maria Mariana II is a 1998 Malaysian Malay-language action crime film directed by Yusof Haslam. It was the sequel to the 1996 hit film Maria Mariana. The film was released in Malaysian cinemas on 2 April 1998.

Synopsis
Maria is rushed to the hospital and is saved by Dr. Faris who successfully extracts the bullet from her body. Maria is assigned to the Special Unit of the Royal Malaysian Police force. She falls in love with Dr. Faris. Her unit has been directed to smash a syndicate which is trafficking ecstasy pills and drugs in the city. Meanwhile, Mariana is visited by Remy, a colleague who is attracted to her. Roy, her ex-boyfriend reappears causing turmoil in her life and Mariana reverts to her old wild ways. The relationship between the two sisters, Maria and Mariana consequently becomes strained again.

Cast
 Erra Fazira as Maria
 Ziana Zain as Mariana
 Awie as Sazali
 Ning Baizura as Rosie
 Rosyam Nor as Remy
 Jesslyn as Susan
 Noraini Hashim as Zainab
 Shaharon Anuar as ASP Shaharon Anuar 
 Zulkifli Ismail as Dr. Faris
 Roy Azman as Ray
 Deen Maidin as Mat Motor
 Syamsul Yusof as Bridesmaids (uncredited extra)

Reception
The film was released on 2 April 1998 for 42 days in 32 cinemas across Malaysia and grossed RM3,159,002.

Soundtrack

 "Maria Mariana" (Slam)
 "Puncak Kasih" (Ziana Zain)
 "Kemelut Di Muara Kasih"  (Ziana Zain)
 "Alangkah" (Ning Baizura)
 "Roda-Roda Kuala Lumpur" (AC Mizal)
 "Syurga Hujung Malam" (Awie)
 "Berpisah Jua" (Ziana Zain)
 "Jangan Lama-Lama" (Sweet Charity)
 "Sabar Menanti" (Broery Marantika & Ning Baizura)
 "Ku Cinta Padamu" (Ziana Zain)
 "Jangan Kau Rayu" (Amy)
 "Setia Ku Di Sini" (Ziana Zain)

References

External links
 Maria Mariana II at Filem Malaysia
 

1998 films
1998 romantic drama films
Malay-language films
Malaysian romantic drama films
Malaysian sequel films
Films directed by Yusof Haslam
Films produced by Yusof Haslam
Films with screenplays by Yusof Haslam
Skop Productions films
Grand Brilliance films